This is a list of downtempo artists, a genre of electronic music.

List
Air
All India Radio
The Album Leaf
Alpha
Aron Estocolmo
Arthur Loves Plastic
Banco de Gaia
Bibio
Bitter:Sweet
Blank & Jones
Blue Sky Black Death
Blue States
Boards of Canada
Bohren & der Club of Gore
Bonobo
Boozoo Bajou
Bowery Electric
Brazilian Girls
Burial
Carbon Based Lifeforms
Catching Flies
Charles Webster
Chet Faker
Chinese Man
Clara Hill
Clutchy Hopkins
Colder
Continuum
Craig Armstrong
Daedelus
Darkside
Death In Vegas
Dave Harrington
De-Phazz
D.V.S*
Dido
Dntel
dZihan & Kamien
Elliott Power
Em Flach
Emancipator
Enigma
Esthero
Etro Anime
Fat Jon
Fila Brazillia
Flume
Four Tet
Funki Porcini
Frou Frou
Gaelle
Geyser
Geju
Global Communication
Goldfish
Hallucinogen
Helicopter Girl
Helios
Hooverphonic
Ilya
Iorie
Isaac Euler
IV-IN
Jahcoozi
James Blake
Jazzanova
Jazztronik
Just Emma
Keep Shelly in Athens
Klaus Waldeck
Kruder & Dorfmeister
Kygo
Lamb
Late Night Alumni
Leftfield
Lemon Jelly
Liquid Stranger
Lisa Shaw
Little Dragon
Lorenzo Jaar
Lovage
Masseratti 2lts
Massive Attack
Matthew Herbert
Men I Trust
Mister Lies
Moby
Morcheeba
MoShang
Mr. Scruff
Nicolas Jaar
Nightmares on Wax
Nitin Sawhney
Niju
Noraj Cue
Parov Stelar
Patrick Wolf
Pete Namlook
Portishead
Pretty Lights
Quantic
Rena Jones
Riad Michael
Röyksopp
Rhye
Saafi Brothers
Sabo
Samantha James
Seelenluft
Shulman
Si*Sé
Sophie Barker
Soulstice
Sounds from the Ground
St Germain
Stuart Matthewman
The Cinematic Orchestra
Tipper
Télépopmusik
The Smokering
Thievery Corporation
Tommy Guerrero
Tosca
Tricky
Two Loons for Tea
Tycho
Ulrich Schnauss
Unders
Uberhaupt & Ausserdem
Vanessa Daou
Weekend Players
Wanduta
William Orbit
Zero 7

References

Downtempo
Downtempo